Bingoal Pauwels Sauces WB Development Team is a Belgian UCI continental team founded in 2012. It participates in UCI Continental Circuits races.

Team roster

Major wins
2012
Stage 2b Le Triptyque des Monts et Châteaux, Antoine Demoitié
Stages 2 & 3 Carpathia Couriers Paths, Antoine Demoitié
2013
Stage 3 Le Triptyque des Monts et Châteaux, Florent Mottet
Prologue Carpathian Couriers Race, Boris Vallée
Grand Prix Criquielion, Boris Vallée
2015
Stage 5 Carpathian Couriers Race, Rémy Mertz
2018
Stage 2 Tour du Jura, Tom Wirtgen
Grand Prix Criquielion, Lionel Taminiaux
 U23 Time Trial Championships, Tom Wirtgen
2019
Grand Prix de la ville de Pérenchies, Jens Reynders

National Champions
2018
 Luxembourg U23 Time Trial, Tom Wirtgen

References

External links

UCI Continental Teams (Europe)
Cycling teams based in Belgium
Cycling teams established in 2012